QCEA may refer to:

 Quaker Council for European Affairs, founded in 1979 to promote the values of the Religious Society of Friends (Quakers) in the European context. QCEA, based in Brussels, is an international, not-for-profit organisation under Belgian law
 BT site engineering code for a site at Carlisle
 QCEA, a set of performance assessment standards for education in Qatar